Target is a 1985 American mystery thriller film directed by Arthur Penn and starring Matt Dillon and Gene Hackman. It was the last film distributed by Warner Bros. before ending the distribution deal with CBS and shutting down its film production arm.

Plot

In Dallas, Walter Lloyd runs a lumber business. After checking out at the office, Walter stops by the local racetrack, where his college-age son Chris  works repairing stock cars. He reminds Chris of his mother's departure for Europe that afternoon, and Chris meets him back at the house to send her off.

Though their relationship is slightly strained, the family is tightly woven and carry on amicably, although an underlying tension between father and son is hinted at. Before she leaves, Chris' mother asks Walter to "break through to the kid." Walter attempts to bond with Chris over the next few days, Chris staying at the house and going on a fishing trip with Walter.

That night, the two are awoken by a late-night phone call from Paris informing Walter that his wife has split from her tour group. Although he downplays it, Walter's fear for his wife's well-being is apparent and Chris picks up on it. Prying further, Chris gets Walter to admit that she has, in fact, been missing for two days. With that, Chris and Walter decide to go to Paris to find her.

At the airport, Chris bumps into an attractive backpacker, who introduces herself as Princess Carla, leader of the Sparrow Revolution.

Walter, on the other hand, bumps into a shady man with a gun who shows Walter his wife's jewelry. A few seconds later, an odd-looking man in glasses points a gun at them and, in an attempt to kill Walter, shoots the man holding him up before disappearing. In a moment of uncharacteristic bravado, Walter kicks the dead man's gun under a jacket and scoops it up before anyone can notice. When Chris asks what's going on, Walter replies that it's probably a heart attack.

At the hotel, Walter writes a note telling Chris to stay for any messages, then leaves for the American embassy in Paris. Once there, Walter slides through the embassy with a casual, cavalier attitude, stopping to look at security while taking a drink at a fountain. He walks casually into the office coffee room, where he pours ketchup into a bag with a handkerchief, pretending it's evidence, and waltzes into the head office under the guise of working there. He tells the secretary that her boss is "family," and once inside the office, tells her boss that his wife has been kidnapped, and that "Duke is here".

Walter regroups with Chris at the hotel restaurant, where he tells him that his mother has been kidnapped, and tells him the real story about the shooting at the airport. Chris' reaction, as to be expected, is one of frustration and disbelief. At that point, the embassy's Director Barney Taber enters and Walter (whom Taber calls "Duke") and he embrace. He alludes to having seen Chris when he was a baby, and expresses sadness at his mother's kidnapping. Chris begins to tell Taber what's going on, but Walter covers up the conversation by telling him that he and Chris had been talking about something else. Before he leaves, Taber asks Walter what name he's traveling under.

A waiter enters with a call for Walter in the office, which the presumably-simple Walter fields in flawless French. After a brief conversation, Walter heads out of the hotel, telling Chris to stay there. Fortunately for Walter, Chris follows him, and saves his life when a car sprays gunshots at Walter. They run away to escape, ducking into an alley where Walter confesses to Chris that he used to work for the CIA. Chris asks him if he's ever killed someone, and Walter downplays the question. Chris, disturbed that his father's life is a lie, runs off, although the two catch up with each other in a café.

Walter tells him about his own history, working as a journalist in France when an agent "tuned into him" at a party. Walter began working for the CIA, performing a variety of duties, but he gave it up when he met his wife and their son was born. A suspicious-looking man enters, and Walter pulls a gun on him, and they leave. Chris tells him that he's going to the police and Taber. Walter tells him it was for his benefit - that Taber is in fact working for the CIA.

The two go to Taber, where they find that another agent, Clay, has been tailing him. Clay and Taber tell them to hole up in their hotel, a piece of advice that Chris and Walter promptly disregard.  Walter decides it's best to look up an old contact of his, a German operative named Lise. They rent a car, Chris making a crack about Walter's driving speed; "Here we go to Hamburg, twenty miles an hour..."

The two make their way slowly to Paris until Walter spots a tail on them, at which point he takes off in high gear. Walter weaves expertly through the countryside, shaking the tail at extremely high speeds. When the two lay a trap for the tail, they find out that they're being watched by the CIA to make sure they don't get into trouble. Walter tells him to pull the tail off, warning that if he sees him again, he "won't see him again".

After buying some clothes, the two leave for Hamburg by train. The agent tailing the Lloyds reports to Taber with a paltry two digits of a phone number that Walter dialed, (4-0). Taber is understandably upset, and sends him out of the office.

At the train station, Walter and Chris see a man approach a similar pair - a young man and his father - yelling "Mendelssohn" to them. After spotting the Lloyds, the man grabs a fiddle from a nearby busker and begins playing a well-known Felix Mendelssohn tune. The two laugh it off as they walk away, although it's apparent that Walter makes more of it than Chris does. On the way out, Chris spots the backpacker he met at the airport in Paris.

They arrive at Lise's, where a history between Walter and Lise is hinted at. Lise helps the two get settled, and while Chris sleeps, the two reminisce about their days in the trade. Lise calls Walter her "Dear Duke," and recalls having loved him. At this point, Chris wakes up and listens to the two talking about what could have been, had they not chosen a life of intrigue and mystery. Lise asks Walter about his Donna, who Walter insinuates was completely worth giving up his life for.

The next day, Lise sends Walter and Chris off to meet "The Colonel", Walter's old boss. Chris spots the fiddle player from the train station, and Walter tears off in the car. They attempt to lose their pursuers, but when they can't, Walter takes off on foot with Chris presumably driving to meet the Colonel. When Chris spots the assassin who attempted to kill Walter earlier, he sticks around, driving through the port they've stopped by to rescue his father. Cornered by the two undercover agents, Walter jumps off the pier onto a passing ferry. The two agents hum the same tune to Walter, and point for him to meet them further up the channel. The eyeglass-wearing assassin attempts to kill Walter, but ultimately only kills one of the agents attempting to catch up with Walter. Chris picks Walter up and the two drive to the Colonel's.

Once at the Colonel's, Walter asks him about the man at the airport - Heinz Henke. They recall "Operation Clean Sweep", where they killed five of six agents. The Colonel recalls something about a family, the family of the agent Clean Sweep didn't kill. The Colonel asks them what happened at the train station, and Walter tells him about the fiddle player. When he hums the tune, the Colonel recognizes it as from the Mendelssohn Violin Concerto, whereupon Walter recalls that "Mendelssohn" was the codename of the sixth agent who escaped "Operation Clean Sweep"; that agent was also known as Schroeder.

Later that night, Walter leaves for West Berlin, to the Marie-Louise Pension, leaving Chris in the care of Lise. Chris has a moment of honesty with Lise, who tells him about her desire to be with Walter, to have a son like Chris. Chris then leaves on a train to Frankfurt, where he'll presumably be safe with a contact of Lise's.

In the following scene, the assassin visits the Colonel, who tortures the emphysema-ridden Colonel for the Lloyds' location by depriving him of oxygen. Though the Colonel does not give them up, his caretaker does, and the assassin kills both of them. 
 
At the train station, Chris spots Carla, who's headed to Berlin to stay with friends. The two have an exchange, and Chris decides to surprise Carla by changing his travel plans to Berlin. Once in Berlin, Chris stays with Carla and the two make love. The next morning, Chris tells Carla he has to leave to find his father; she says she'll wait for him in bed.

Lise contacts Walter, informing him that "his old military friend has died..." painfully. She tells him he has been exposed, and the package he mailed to Frankfurt (referring to Chris), has not arrived. Lise warns him to be careful, before she says a tearful goodbye and embarks on a boat. While he's shaving at the pension, Walter hears a knock at the door. Suspicious, he pulls his gun and approaches the door, but to his surprise, it's Chris. He tearfully exclaims that he could've killed him, hugging him tightly and dropping the gun. Frustrated that Chris has met up with him, he fills Chris in on his plans. The two bond shortly thereafter, however, and Walter sends Chris out after a short briefing on Agency tradecraft to keep watch at a café near the pension.

Their plan is disrupted, however, when Carla appears at the café. Chris asks her how she found him, and she tells him she followed him out of jealousy. Through the window, Walter spots Chris talking to her, and gives a frustrated shrug. When Chris spots the assassin, he moves to signal his father with a newspaper, but Carla pulls a gun on him and forces him to stay put, which shocks the unsuspecting Chris. The assassin moves up to kill Walter; Chris unable to warn him. The assassin enters the apartment, but Walter suspects a setup and gets the drop on him, shooting the assassin dead. After the gunshot is fired, the customers direct their attention to the window, and Chris uses the opportunity to slug Carla in the face. He runs upstairs to his father, and the two flee.

That night, after ditching the gun in a river, Walter says goodbye to Chris before heading into East Berlin. Though Chris is scared he'll never see his father again, he follows his orders and heads to the US Embassy in Berlin. Walter warns him that the CIA will be crawling all over the place, and tells Chris to tell them nothing. Once through the border in East Berlin, Walter is picked up by a motorcycle courier who takes him to a small farm in the country to meet with Schroeder. Schroeder is at first cryptic, leaving Walter guessing as to what his desire is. Walter goes down the list of possible motives - information, of which he has none; money, which he can raise. Schroeder beckons him over to get a closer look at him, and after a closer look, proclaims "this is the murderer of children..."

Chris, at this point, has come back into Taber's custody, where the CIA pumps him for information. Chris gives them none, much to the frustration of Clay and the other agents.

Back at Schroeder's farm, the two men look on at the gravestones of Schroeder's family. Schroeder grimly tells Walter of the deaths of his family, a wife and two teenage children murdered in cold blood because the CIA failed to arrest Schroeder himself. Walter denies being responsible for their deaths. He even investigated the tragedy but all his people were cleared. Walter then quit, finding the promise of raising a family more appealing than a life of espionage. Though Schroeder doesn't believe his story, Walter convinces him that there's another party involved. He tells him about the assassin, of a group who's been trying to kill him since he arrived in Europe who may have "walked in both camps."

In Taber's office, Chris is contacted by his father, who updates him on the situation and tells him to head to an abandoned air force base where the CIA used to exchange captured agents with the East. Though he leaves Taber's office and proceeds alone to East Berlin, Taber and Clay catch up with him and Walter. While Walter and Taber talk, Chris walks over to the hangar nearby where he finds his mother bound and gagged, wrapped in plastic explosives.

Walter and Clay manage to defuse the bomb, at which point Taber is revealed as the double agent who betrayed both Schroeder and Walter when he pulls a gun on Walter and shoots Clay. He forces the Lloyds to kneel, but Walter gets the jump on him when Schroeder reappears. Though he denies it, it's deduced that Taber was responsible for the death of Schroeder's family, and Schroeder's bodyguard straps Taber to the chair rigged with explosives. An angry and distraught Schroeder, finally faced with the man responsible for the death of his son, his daughter, and his wife, sends Walter and Chris away with Donna in tow before blowing himself and Taber up.

The family, reunited, embrace as the hangar erupts in a massive explosion. Chris, looking on at the devastation caused by the double lives his father and the other agents have lived, realizes who his father truly is before embracing his family once again.

Cast
Gene Hackman - Walter Lloyd/Duncan (Duke) Potter
Matt Dillon - Chris Lloyd/Derek Potter
Gayle Hunnicutt - Donna Lloyd
Josef Sommer - Barney Taber
Guy Boyd - Clay
Viktoriya Fyodorova - Lise
Herbert Berghof - Schroeder
Ilona Grübel - Carla
James Selby - Ross
Ray Fry - Mason
Richard Münch - The Colonel
Tomas Hnevsa - Henke
Jean-Pol Dubois - Glasses/Assassin
Robert Ground - Marine Sergeant
Véronique Guillaud - Secretary American Consulate
Charlotte Bailey - Receptionist
Randy Moore - Tour Director
Jacques Mignot - Madison Hotel Clerk
Robert Liensol - Cafe Vendor
Werner Pochath - Young Agent
Jany Holt - Proprietress. Marie Louis Mansion

Production
The film was Penn's first since the commercial failure Four Friends released in 1981. It was the first film shot by Penn in Europe. Filming took place in Paris, France; Berlin and Hamburg, Germany; Dallas and Corpus Christi, Texas. The film was made for $1.4 million less than its $12.9 million budget.

Reception
The film was released on November 8, 1985 on 1,085 screens in the United States and opened in second place behind Death Wish 3 with a weekend gross of $2,670,522. It grossed a total of $9 million in the United States and Canada.

The film received a mixed response from critics. On Rotten Tomatoes, Target holds a rating of 67% from 24 reviews.

References

External links 

 
 
 

1985 films
1985 independent films
1980s spy thriller films
1980s mystery thriller films
American independent films
American mystery thriller films
American spy thriller films
CBS Theatrical Films films
Cold War spy films
Films about kidnapping
Films about the Central Intelligence Agency
Films about families
Films about missing people
American films about revenge
Films directed by Arthur Penn
Films set in West Germany
Films set in East Germany
Films set in Hamburg
Films shot in Corpus Christi, Texas
Films shot in Germany
Films shot in Hamburg
Films produced by Richard D. Zanuck
Films produced by David Brown
Films scored by Michael Small
1980s English-language films
1980s American films